XIV Brigade, Royal Horse Artillery was a brigade of the Royal Horse Artillery which existed in the early part of the 20th century. It had been dissolved before World War I but was reformed for the war.  It served with 7th Division on the Western Front before becoming XIV Army Brigade, RHA in February 1917.  It was disbanded at the end of the war.

History

Formation
Royal Horse Artillery brigades did not exist as an organizational or operational grouping of batteries until 1 July 1859 when the Horse Brigade, Royal Artillery was formed.  The brigade system was extended to five (later six) brigades when the horse artillery of the Honourable East India Company had been transferred to the British Army in 1861. These brigades were reduced to five in 1871, then to three (of 10 batteries each) in 1877 and to two (of 13 batteries each) in 1882. The brigade system was finally abolished in 1889.

As battery designations were tied to the brigade that the battery was assigned to, batteries were redesignated in a bewildering sequence as they were transferred between brigades. For example, E Battery of C Brigade (E/C Bty) might become N Battery of A Brigade (N/A Bty) upon transfer. Henceforth, batteries were designated in a single alphabetical sequence in order of seniority from date of formation.

The brigade system was revived in 1901. Each brigade now commanded just two batteries and a small staff (a Lieutenant-Colonel in command, an adjutant and a brigade sergeant major). Initially, batteries were not assigned to brigades in any particular order, but in 1906, at the insistence of Edward VII, brigades were redesignated so that batteries were roughly in order of seniority (hence I Brigade commanded A Battery and B Battery).

XIV Brigade, RHA was formed on 1 March 1901 as the IV Brigade-Division, RHA with Z Battery and AA Battery. In 1903 it was redesignated as IV Brigade, RHA and was stationed at Woolwich.  On 1 October 1906, it was redesignated as XIV Brigade, RHA and was dissolved on 1 August 1913.  AA Battery had been disbanded on 1 May 1913 and Z battery was transferred to II Brigade, RHA at Canterbury.

World War I

Reformed
XIV Brigade, RHA was reformed in September 1914 with C Battery (from II Brigade, RHA), F Battery (from IV Brigade, RHA) and XIV RHA Brigade Ammunition Column.  It joined 7th Division at Lyndhurst on formation.  With 7th Division, it crossed to Belgium on 4 and 5 October 1914 (landing at Zeebrugge on 6 October) and served with the division on the Western Front until February 1917.  While with the division, it saw considerable action serving at the Siege of Antwerp, the First Battle of Ypres, and in the battles of Neuve Chapelle, Aubers Ridge, Festubert, Loos, and of the Somme.

Changes in organization
On 19 October 1914, C Battery left the brigade to join XV (later IV) Brigade, RHA in 3rd Cavalry Division.  It was not replaced until 21 December 1914 when T Battery joined from The Force in Egypt.  On 19 June 1915, F and T batteries replaced their 13-pounders with six 18-pounders each.

57th (H) Battery, RFA joined from XXXVII (Howitzer) Brigade, RFA on 27 November 1914.  It returned to XXXVII (H) Brigade on 2 March 1915.

D (H)/XIV Battery was formed on 17 May 1916 with one section of 31st (H) Battery and one section of 35th (H) Battery (both of XXXVII (H) Brigade, RFA).

On 7 October 1916, 509th (H) Battery (four 4.5-inch howitzers) joined the brigade.  On 13 February 1917 it was broken up to make up 31st (H) and 35th (H) batteries to six howitzers each.

Army brigade
On 10 February 1917, the brigade left 7th Division and became XIV Army Brigade, RHA.  On 13 February, B Battery of CLXIX Brigade, RFA (B/CLXIX Battery) joined as C/XIV and one section of C(H)/CLXIX Battery, RFA made up D(H)/XIV Battery to six 4.5-inch howitzers.  C/XIV Battery was later redesignated as 400th Battery and D(H)/XIV as 401st (H) Battery.

The brigade moved to Italy in December 1917, before returning to the Western Front in March 1918.  At the Armistice, it was serving as Army Troops with the Third Army with F Battery RHA, T Battery RHA, 400th Battery RFA and 401st (H) Battery RFA (eighteen 18-pounders and six 4.5-inch howitzers).

The brigade was disbanded in Germany in May 1919.  400th and 401st (H) batteries were disbanded, F Battery joined III Brigade, RHA and T Battery joined IX Brigade, RHA, both in the United Kingdom.

See also

14th Regiment, Royal Horse Artillery for a similarly numbered regiment in World War II.

Notes

References

Bibliography

External links
The Royal Horse Artillery on The Long, Long Trail
7th Division on The Long, Long Trail
7th Division on the Regimental Warpath

Royal Horse Artillery brigades
Artillery units and formations of World War I
Military units and formations established in 1901
Military units and formations disestablished in 1913
Military units and formations established in 1914
Military units and formations disestablished in 1919